Events from the year 1952 in Canada.

Incumbents

Crown 
 Monarch – George VI (until February 6) then Elizabeth II

Federal government 
 Governor General – the Viscount Alexander of Tunis (until February 28), then Vincent Massey
 Prime Minister – Louis St. Laurent
 Chief Justice – Thibaudeau Rinfret (Quebec) 
 Parliament – 21st

Provincial governments

Lieutenant governors 
Lieutenant Governor of Alberta – John J. Bowlen   
Lieutenant Governor of British Columbia – Clarence Wallace 
Lieutenant Governor of Manitoba – Roland Fairbairn McWilliams  
Lieutenant Governor of New Brunswick – David Laurence MacLaren 
Lieutenant Governor of Newfoundland – Leonard Outerbridge 
Lieutenant Governor of Nova Scotia – John Alexander Douglas McCurdy (until September 1) then Alistair Fraser 
Lieutenant Governor of Ontario – Ray Lawson (until February 18) then Louis Orville Breithaupt 
Lieutenant Governor of Prince Edward Island – Thomas William Lemuel Prowse 
Lieutenant Governor of Quebec – Gaspard Fauteux  
Lieutenant Governor of Saskatchewan – William John Patterson

Premiers 
Premier of Alberta – Ernest Manning   
Premier of British Columbia – Byron Johnson (until August 1) then W.A.C. Bennett 
Premier of Manitoba – Douglas Campbell 
Premier of New Brunswick – John McNair (until October 8) then Hugh John Flemming  
Premier of Newfoundland – Joey Smallwood 
Premier of Nova Scotia – Angus Macdonald 
Premier of Ontario – Leslie Frost 
Premier of Prince Edward Island – J. Walter Jones  
Premier of Quebec – Maurice Duplessis 
Premier of Saskatchewan – Tommy Douglas

Territorial governments

Commissioners 
 Commissioner of Yukon – Frederick Fraser (until November 5) then Wilfred George Brown 
 Commissioner of Northwest Territories – Hugh Andrew Young

Events
January 24 – Vincent Massey appointed first Canada-born Governor-General of Canada
February 6 – Elizabeth II becomes Queen of Canada upon the death of her father George VI.
June 11 – Saskatchewan election: Tommy Douglas's Co-operative Commonwealth Federation wins a third consecutive majority
May 25 – Korean War: Canadian troops are dispatched to the troubled Geoje POW Camp
August 1 – W.A.C. Bennett becomes premier of British Columbia, replacing Byron Johnson
August 5 – Alberta election: Ernest Manning's Social Credit Party wins a fifth consecutive majority
September 6 – The first CBC Television station, CBFT, goes on the air in Montreal, Quebec
September 8 – CBLT (CBC Toronto) goes on air
September 11 – Volkswagen of Canada is founded.
September 16 – The Boyd Gang is captured
October 2 – Korean War: , while shelling an enemy train in Korea, is hit by return fire from shore batteries. Three sailors were killed and 10 wounded: the only Royal Canadian Navy casualties of the war.
October 8 – Hugh John Flemming becomes premier of New Brunswick, replacing John McNair
October 14 – Lester B. Pearson is elected President of the United Nations General Assembly.

Full date unknown
Fighting in the Korean War drags on as the factions attempt to negotiate an armistice.
The pension system is reformed with the introduction of the Old Age Security Act.
Roy Thomson acquires The Scotsman and emigrates to Britain
Painters Eleven founded.
Atomic Energy Canada founded.
 Manitoba women were first permitted to serve on juries. (New Brunswick women become jurors in 1954, and PEI women in 1966).

Arts and literature

New books
Thomas B. Costain: The Silver Chalice

Awards
See 1952 Governor General's Awards for a complete list of winners and finalists for those awards.
Stephen Leacock Award: Jan Hilliard, The Salt Box

Sport
February 24 – Canada men's national ice hockey team (represented by the Edmonton Mercurys) win their 7th (consecutive and last until 2002) Gold Medal at the 1952 Winter Olympics in Oslo, Norway
April 15 – The Detroit Red Wings win their fifth Stanley Cup by defeating the Montreal Canadiens 4 games to 0.
May 2 – The Ontario Hockey Association's Guelph Biltmore Mad Hatters win their only Memorial Cup by defeating the Saskatchewan Junior Hockey League's Regina Pats 4 games to 0. The deciding Game 4 was played at Maple Leaf Gardens in Toronto
November 29 – The Toronto Argonauts win their tenth (and last until 1983) Grey Cup by defeating the Edmonton Eskimos 21–11 in the 40th Grey Cup played at Toronto's Varsity Stadium

Births

January to June
January 1 – Rosario Marchese, Italian-Canadian educator and politician
January 19 – Michel Plante, ice hockey left winger
February – Kathy Dunderdale, politician and 10th Premier of Newfoundland and Labrador
February 3 – Wayne Erdman, judoka
February 18 – Bernard Valcourt, politician and lawyer
February 27 – Maureen McTeer, author and lawyer
March 4 – Svend Robinson, politician, Canada's first openly homosexual elected official and prominent activist for gay rights
May 13 – Mary Walsh, actress and comedian
May 17 – Howard Hampton, politician
June 2 – Ferron, folk singer-songwriter and poet
June 6 – Jean Hamel, ice hockey player
June 22 – Graham Greene, actor
June 29 – David Dingwall, politician, Minister and civil servant

July to September
July 1
Dan Aykroyd, comedian, actor, screenwriter and musician
Sam George, native rights activist (d. 2009)
Deborah Grey, politician
July 3 – Rohinton Mistry, author
July 6 – George Athans, world-champion water skier
July 7 – David Milgaard, wrongfully convicted of murder (d. 2022)
July 13 – Rosemary Dunsmore, actress
July 25 – Nancy Allan, politician
July 31 – Kent Angus, businessman (d. 2021)
August 9 – Gary Kowalski, politician
September 8 – Sue Barnes, politician
September 10 – Vic Toews, politician
September 12 – Neil Peart, drummer and author (d. 2020)

October to December

October 2 – Marie Deschamps, jurist and puisne justice on the Supreme Court of Canada
October 4 – Angela Coughlan, swimmer and Olympic bronze medalist (d. 2009)
October 22 – Peggy Baker, dancer
November 10 – Jim Maloway, politician
November 16 – Candas Jane Dorsey, poet and science fiction novelist
November 27 – Sheila Copps, journalist and politician
December 12 – Herb Dhaliwal, politician and Minister
December 24 – Lorne Calvert, politician and 13th Premier of Saskatchewan
December 27 – Jay Hill, politician

Full date unknown
Di Brandt, poet and literary critic
David Macfarlane, journalist, playwright and novelist
Bob McLeod, politician and 12th Premier of the Northwest Territories

Deaths
February 6 – George VI, King of Canada (b. 1895)
June 21 – Wilfrid R. "Wop" May, World War I flying ace and pioneering bush pilot (b. 1896)
July 6 – Louis-Alexandre Taschereau, politician and 14th Premier of Quebec (b. 1867)
August 31 – Henri Bourassa, politician and publisher (b. 1868)
October 6 – Walter Stanley Monroe, businessman, politician and Prime Minister of Newfoundland (b. 1871)
October 18 – Joseph-Mathias Tellier, politician (b. 1861)
November 8 – Harold Innis, professor of political economy and author (b. 1894)

Full date unknown
James Breakey, politician (b. 1865)

See also
 1952 in Canadian television
 List of Canadian films

References

 
Years of the 20th century in Canada
Canada
1952 in North America